Tennis at the Pacific Games has been contested since 1963 when it was included as one of ten sports at the First South Pacific Games held in Suva, Fiji.

Tennis has also been played at many of the Pacific Mini Games, starting with the first edition held at Honiara in 1981.

Pacific Games

Flag icons and three letter country code indicate the nationality of the gold medal winner of an event, where this information is known; otherwise an (X) is used. Moving the cursor onto a country code with a dotted underline will reveal the name of the gold medal winner. A dash (–) indicates an event that was not contested.

Pacific Mini Games

See also
Tennis at the Summer Olympics

Notes

References
 

 
Pacific Games
Pacific Games